Advent Tidende (Danish: Advent Herald) was a Danish language monthly journal which was in circulation between 1871 and 1883. It was headquartered in Battle Creek, Michigan, and was the first publication of the Seventh-day Adventists in other language than the English language.

History and profile
Advent Tidende was founded in 1871 and published by Syvende-Dags Advent Trykkeri-Selskab until 1883 in Battle Creek, Michigan. It was started by the Scandinavian Seventh-day Adventists, a Protestant Christian denomination, as a 21-page monthly publication. The editor was John Gotlieb Matteson. In the second year of its existence Advent Tidende was expanded, and its page number became thirty-two. The successor of the magazine which was published on a monthly basis was Sandhedens Tidende.

Several copies of Advent Tidende were sent to both Denmark and Norway from the USA.

References

External links
WorldCat record

1871 establishments in Michigan
1883 disestablishments in the United States
Danish-language magazines
Defunct magazines published in the United States
Magazines established in 1871
Magazines disestablished in 1883
Magazines published in Michigan
Religious magazines published in the United States
Seventh-day Adventist periodicals
Monthly magazines published in the United States